McVille Airport  is a privately owned, public use airport located six nautical miles (11 km) northeast of the central business district of Freeport, a borough in Armstrong County, Pennsylvania, United States.

Facilities and aircraft 
McVille Airport covers an area of 100 acres (40 ha) at an elevation of 1,090 feet (332 m) above mean sea level. It has one runway with asphalt surface: 14/32 is 2,800 by 60 feet (854 x 18 m).

For the 12-month period ending April 30, 2007, the airport had 11,010 aircraft operations, an average of 30 per day: 99.9% general aviation and 0.1% military. At that time there were 56 aircraft based at this airport: 95% single-engine, 4% multi-engine and 2% ultralight.

References

External links 
 McVille Airport (P37) at PennDOT Bureau of Aviation
 Aerial photo as of April 1993 from USGS The National Map via MSR Maps

Defunct airports in Pennsylvania
Airports in Pennsylvania
Transportation buildings and structures in Armstrong County, Pennsylvania